Jordan Township is one of twelve townships in Warren County, Indiana, United States. According to the 2010 census, its population was 247 and it contained 105 housing units. It is almost entirely agricultural and contains no incorporated towns.

History
Jordan Township was created in 1850 from a section of the adjacent Liberty Township.  At this time the land was marshy and not considered very good for farming, and was used largely for grazing livestock.  Starting around 1880, some of the higher ground began to be farmed, and as the population increased this was expanded.  The grain grown was either fed to livestock or hauled by wagon to elevators at Ambia, West Lebanon, or Rossville, Illinois.

Geography
The small town of Pence lies near the western edge of the township, which is also the Illinois border. Near the southern border of the township lies the town of Hedrick. The town of Sloan once existed just east of Hedrick but no buildings now remain.

Cemeteries
The township's only cemetery is Jordan Cemetery.

Education
Jordan Township is part of the Metropolitan School District of Warren County.

Government
Jordan Township has a trustee who administers rural fire protection and ambulance service, provides relief to the poor, manages cemetery care, and performs farm assessment, among other duties. The trustee is assisted in these duties by a three-member township board. The trustees and board members are elected to four-year terms.

Jordan Township is part of Indiana's 8th congressional district, Indiana House of Representatives District 42, and Indiana State Senate District 38.

References

 
 United States Census Bureau TIGER/Line Shapefiles

Bibliography

External links

Townships in Warren County, Indiana
Populated places established in 1850
1850 establishments in Indiana
Townships in Indiana